The 1981 Grand Prix d'Automne was the 75th edition of the Paris–Tours cycle race and was held on 11 October 1981. The race started in Blois and finished in Chaville. The race was won by Jan Raas.

General classification

References

1981 in French sport
1981
October 1981 sports events in Europe
1981 Super Prestige Pernod